The 2021–22 Fairleigh Dickinson Knights men's basketball team represented Fairleigh Dickinson University in the 2021–22 NCAA Division I men's basketball season. The Knights, led by ninth-year head coach Greg Herenda, played their home games at the Rothman Center in Hackensack, New Jersey as members of the Northeast Conference.

Previous season
In a season limited due to the ongoing COVID-19 pandemic, the Knights finished the 2020–21 season 9–15, 8–10 in NEC play to finish in eighth place. They failed to qualify for the NEC tournament.

Roster

Schedule and results
The Knights game against Drexel scheduled for November 12, 2021 was postponed due to their bus breaking down and being unable to make it to the game.

NEC COVID-19 policy provided that if a team could not play a conference game due to COVID-19 issues within its program, the game would be declared a forfeit and the other team would receive a conference win. However, wins related to COVID-19 do not count pursuant to NCAA policy.

|-
!colspan=12 style=| Exhibition

|-
!colspan=12 style=| Non-conference regular season

|-
!colspan=12 style=| NEC regular season

|-
!colspan=9 style=| NEC tournament

Sources

References

Fairleigh Dickinson Knights men's basketball seasons
Fairleigh Dickinson Knights
Fairleigh Dickinson Knights men's basketball
Fairleigh Dickinson Knights men's basketball